Erden Glacier is the 6 km long and 2.8 km wide glacier on Oscar II Coast in Graham Land situated southwest of Lesicheri Glacier.  It drains the southeast slopes of Forbidden Plateau, and flows southeastwards to join Jorum Glacier.  The feature is named after the settlement of Erden in Northwestern Bulgaria.

Location

British mapping in 1976.

Maps

 British Antarctic Territory.  Scale 1:200000 topographic map.  DOS 610 Series, Sheet W 65 62.  Directorate of Overseas Surveys, Tolworth, UK, 1976.
 Antarctic Digital Database (ADD). Scale 1:250000 topographic map of Antarctica. Scientific Committee on Antarctic Research (SCAR). Since 1993, regularly upgraded and updated.

References
 Erden Glacier. SCAR Composite Antarctic Gazetteer.
 Bulgarian Antarctic Gazetteer. Antarctic Place-names Commission. (details in Bulgarian, basic data in English)

External links
 Erden Glacier. Copernix satellite image

Glaciers of Oscar II Coast
Bulgaria and the Antarctic